Illawarra, an electoral district of the Legislative Assembly in the Australian state of New South Wales, has had three incarnations, the first from 1859 to 1904, the second from 1927 to 1968 and the third from 1971 to 2007.


Election results

Elections in the 2000s

2003

Elections in the 1990s

1999

1995

1991

Elections in the 1980s

1988

1984

1981

Elections in the 1970s

1978

1976

1973

1971

1968 - 1971

Elections in the 1960s

1965

1962

Elections in the 1950s

1959

1956

1953

1950

Elections in the 1940s

1947

1944

1941

Elections in the 1930s

1938

1935

1932

1930

Elections in the 1920s

1927

1904 - 1927

Elections in the 1900s

1904 by-election

1901

Elections in the 1890s

1898

1895

1894

1891 by-election

1891

Elections in the 1880s

1889

1887

1885

1882

1880

1880 by-election

Elections in the 1870s

1877

1874-75

1872

Elections in the 1860s

1869-70

1866 by-election

1864-65

1860

Elections in the 1850s

1859 by-election

1859

References

New South Wales state electoral results by district